Shī (施) is a Chinese surname. It is written as Sze or Sy in Cantonese or Hokkien romanisation. According to a 2013 study it was the 106th most common name, being shared by 2.06 million people or 0.150% of the population, with Jiangsu being the province with the most people. It is 23rd on the Hundred Family Surnames, contained in the verse 何呂施張 (He Lü Shi Zhang).

In Vietnamese is it written Thi.

Notable people
Shi Lang (施琅, 1621–1696), Marquis Jinghai, a Chinese admiral who served under the Ming and Qing dynasties, helped conquer Taiwan
Shi Hairong (施海荣)
Shi Haoran, (施浩然), a Chinese swimmer who competed for Team China at the 2008 Summer Olympics
Shi Yiguang (施夷光), better known as Xi Shi (西施), one of the renowned Four Beauties of ancient China.
Shi Jianqiao (施剑翘), the daughter of the Chinese military officer Shi Congbin, whose killing she avenged by assassinating the former warlord Sun Chuanfang
Shi Tingmao (施廷懋), a Chinese diver representing Chongqing diving team
Shih Wing-ching (施永青), a Hong Kong businessman
Shi Zhecun (施蛰存), a Chinese author and journal editor in Shanghai during the 1930s
Shih Chih-ming (施治明), a Taiwanese politician of the Kuomintang party
Shih Chin-tien (施金典), a Taiwanese baseball player who currently plays for Uni-President Lions of Chinese Professional Baseball League
Shih Ming-teh (施明德), political activist in Taiwan and was once a political prisoner for 25-and-a-half years
Simon Min Sze (施敏), electrical engineer who invented the floating-gate MOSFET with Dawon Kahng
Henry Sy (施至成), former richest taipan billionaire in the Philippines

Individual Chinese surnames